Abī-Ešuḫ (variants: ma-bi-ši, "Abiši", mE-bi-šum, "Ebišum") was the 8th king of the 1st Dynasty of Babylon and reigned for 28 years from ca. 1648–1620 BC (short chronology) or 1711–1684 BC (middle chronology). He was preceded by Samsu-iluna, who was his father.

Biography
 
His exuberant titles included, “descendant of Sumu-la-El, princely heir of Samsu-iluna, eternal seed of kingship, mighty king, king of Babylon, king of the land of Sumer and Akkad, king who makes the four quarters be at peace.” This was presumably achieved by his two aggressive military campaigns. His fourth year-name records that he subdued the army of the Kassites. The Chronicle of Early Kings recalls his damming of the Tigris in a vain attempt to capture Ilum-ma-ilī, the founder of the Sealand Dynasty. A clay cylinder fragment from Kiš is tentatively assigned to this king because the events it commemorates coincide with three of his year-names. It mentions the Tigris river (year “o” the damming of the Tigris), the Tigris gate (year “m” the ká-gal-i7idigna), the fashioning of a mace for Marduk (year “g”) and digging of the Zubi canal (year “I”). He is described as “the great champion” in his son, Ammi-Ditana's inscription, and in the genealogy of his descendant Ammī-ṣaduqa. The Elamites under their king Kutir-nahhunte I raided into Babylonia early in his reign and sacked 30 cities.
 
Two copies of a building inscription commemorate his construction activities at Luḫaia, a town founded by Ḫammu-rāpi on the Araḫtum canal to the north of Babylon. A single inscription exists found on an onyx eye stone dedicated to the goddess Ningal.
 
He is richly attested in the cylinder seal impressions of his minions with one of his servant, Lamānum, son of Bēl-kulla, another of Luštāmar-Adad, son of Mār-Sipparim, another of Nabi’um-an[dasa], son of Ilšu-ib[nīšu], another … son of Awīl-…, another Ilšu-nāṣir, diviner, son of Marduk-nāṣir, another a copy Iddin-Šamaš, sanga priest of the goddess Ninisina, son of Ku-Ninisina, and another overseer of the merchants, Sīn-iddina[m] son of Šērum-bān[i]. The Uruk List of Kings and Sages records that “during the reign of Abī-ešuḫ, the king, Gimil-Gula and Taqis-Gula were the scholars.”.

Inscriptions

References

External links
Abī-Ešuḫ year-names at CDLI.
A hymn to Marduk for Abī-Ešuḫ at ETCSL.
A praise poem of Abī-Ešuḫ at ETCSL.

17th-century BC Babylonian kings
First dynasty of Babylon